Graham Parkes (born 1949) is a comparative philosopher and Professorial Research Fellow at the University of Vienna.
He is known for his works on Nietzsche, Heidegger, and Asian philosophies.

Books
Heidegger and Asian Thought, (Honolulu: The University of Hawai'i Press, 1987)
Nietzsche and Asian Thought, (Chicago: The University of Chicago Press, 1991)

References

Philosophy academics
University of Hawaiʻi at Mānoa faculty
Date of birth missing (living people)
Living people
1949 births
Academics of University College Cork